The 2018 LKL Finals was the championship series of the 2017–18 season, of the LKL. The finals series were scheduled from 9 June until 18 June 2018. Due to home court advantage,  Žalgiris played Game 1, 3 and 5 at home. Žalgiris defeated Lietuvos rytas ,  earning the franchise its 20th LKL championship. Brandon Davies was named the Finals  MVP.

Venues 
The Žalgiris Arena is a multi-purpose indoor arena in the New Town of Kaunas, Lithuania. The arena is located on an island of the Nemunas River. It is the largest indoor arena in the Baltics. The arena's maximum possible seating capacity for basketball games is 15,552, and 20,000 spectators for concerts (when the stage is in the middle, and 17,000 when stage is in the side of the arena). The Žalgiris Arena replaced the Kaunas Sports Hall as a major venue in the city.

The Siemens Arena, located in Verkiai elderate of Vilnius, is the second largest arena in Lithuania.  It generally hosts basketball games as well as concerts. The arena opened on October 30, 2004. The basketball club BC Lietuvos rytas uses the facility for all of its European home fixtures. Siemens Arena also hosts Rytas' home fixtures of the Lithuanian "national derby" against its archrival BC Žalgiris.

Road to the Finals

Regular season series
Žalgiris and Lietuvos rytas tied the regular season series 2–2.

Game summaries

Game 1

Game 2

Game 3

Game 4

Game 5

Rosters

Žalgiris

Lietuvos rytas

See also
2017–18 LKL season
2018 LKL Play-offs

References

External links
 

Lietuvos krepšinio lyga Finals
Finals